Spanish needles or Spanish needle is a common name for several plants and may refer to:

Bidens species, especially:
Bidens alba
Bidens bipinnata
Bidens pilosa
Palafoxia arida